Cipolla is Italian for onion and may refer to:

Cipolla di Giarratana, a variety of onion
11600 Cipolla (1995 SQ2), a main-belt asteroid
Cipolla's algorithm

People with the surname
Bruno Cipolla (born 1952), Italian rowing coxswain and Olympic champion
Carlo Maria Cipolla (1922–2000), Italian economic historian
Chip Cipolla (died 1994), radio announcer for sports teams in the New York City area
Glorianda Cipolla (born 1946), Italian Olympic alpine skier
Flavio Cipolla (born 1983), professional tennis player on the ATP Tour from Italy
Jason Cipolla (born 1974), American basketball player
Michele Cipolla (died 1947), Italian mathematician
Roberto Cipolla (born 1963), British computer vision researcher
Vin Cipolla (born 1956), American entrepreneur and civic leader

See also

Cipollone
Cipollina (disambiguation)
Cipollini (disambiguation)
Cipollino (disambiguation)
Chipolin (disambiguation)

Italian-language surnames